In Euclidean geometry, a spirolateral is a polygon created by a sequence of fixed vertex internal angles and sequential edge lengths 1,2,3,…,n which repeat until the figure closes. The number of repeats needed is called its cycles. A simple spirolateral has only positive angles. A simple spiral approximates of a portion of an archimedean spiral. A general spirolateral allows positive and negative angles.

A spirolateral which completes in one turn is a simple polygon, while requiring more than 1 turn is a star polygon and must be self-crossing. A simple spirolateral can be an equangular simple polygon <p> with p vertices, or an equiangular star polygon <p/q> with p vertices and q turns.

Spirolaterals were invented and named by Frank C. Odds as a teenager in 1962, as square spirolaterals with 90° angles, drawn on graph paper. In 1970, Odds discovered triangular and hexagonal spirolateral, with 60° and 120° angles, can be drawn on isometric (triangular) graph paper. Odds wrote to Martin Gardner who encouraged him to publish the results in  Mathematics Teacher  in 1973.

The process can be represented in turtle graphics, alternating turn angle and move forward instructions, but limiting the turn to a fixed rational angle.

The smallest golygon is a spirolateral, 790°4, made with 7 right angles, and length 4 follow concave turns. Golygons are different in that they must close with a single sequence 1,2,3,..n, while a spirolateral will repeat that sequence until it closes.

Classifications

A simple spirolateral has turns all the same direction. It is denoted by nθ, where n is the number of sequential integer edge lengths and θ is the internal angle, as any rational divisor of 360°. Sequential edge lengths can be expressed explicitly as (1,2,...,n)θ.

Note: The angle θ can be confusing because it represents the internal angle, while the supplementary turn angle can make more sense. These two angles are the same for 90°.

This defines an equiangular polygon of the form <kp/kq>, where angle θ = 180(1−2q/p), with k = n/d, and d = gcd(n,p). If d = n, the pattern never closes. Otherwise it has kp vertices and kq density. The cyclic symmetry of a simple spirolateral is p/d-fold.

A regular polygon, {p} is a special case of a spirolateral,  1180(1−2/p)°. A regular star polygon, {p/q}, is a special case of a spirolateral, 1180(1−2q/p)°. An isogonal polygon, is a special case spirolateral, 2180(1−2/p)° or 2180(1−2q/p)°.

A general spirolateral can turn left or right. It is denoted by nθa1,...,ak, where ai are indices with negative or concave angles. For example, 260°2 is a crossed rectangle with ±60° internal angles, bending left or right.

An unexpected closed spiralateral returns to the first vertex on a single cycle. Only general spirolaterals may not close. A golygon is a regular unexpected closed spiralateral that closes from the expected direction. An irregular unexpected closed spiralateral is one that returns to the first point but from the wrong direction. For example 790°4. It takes 4 cycles to return to the start in the correct direction.

A modern spirolateral, also called a loop-de-loops by Educator Anna Weltman, is denoted by (i1,...,in)θ, allowing any sequence of integers as the edge lengths, i1 to in. For example, (2,3,4)90° has edge lengths 2,3,4 repeating. Opposite direction turns can be given a negative integer edge length. For example, a crossed rectangle can be given as (1,2,−1,−2)θ.

An open spirolateral never closes. A simple spirolateral, nθ, never closes if nθ is a multiple of 360°, gcd(p,n) = p. A general spirolateral can also be open if half of the angles are positive, half negative.

Closure 
The number of cycles it takes to close a spirolateral, nθ, with k opposite turns, p/q=360/(180-θ) can be computed. Reduce fraction (p-2q)(n-2k)/2p = a/b. The figure repeats after b cycles, and complete a total turns. If b=1, the figure never closes.

Explicitly, the number of cycles is 2p/d, where d=gcd((p-2q)(n-2k),2p). If d=2p, it closes on 1 cycle or never.

The number of cycles can be seen as the rotational symmetry order of the spirolateral.
n90°

n60°

Small simple spirolaterals 
Spirolaterals can be constructed from any rational divisor of 360°. The first table's columns sample angles from small regular polygons and second table from star polygons, with examples up to n = 6.

An equiangular polygon <p/q> has p vertices and q density. <np/nq> can be reduced by d = gcd(n,p).
 Small whole divisor angles

 Small rational divisor angles

See also 

 Turtle graphics represent a computer language that defines an open or close path as move lengths and turn angles.

References

 Alice Kaseberg Schwandt Spirolaterals: An advanced Investignation from an Elementary Standpoint, Mathematical Teacher, Vol 72, 1979, 166-169 
 Margaret Kenney and Stanley Bezuszka, Square Spirolaterals Mathematics Teaching, Vol 95, 1981, pp.22-27 
 Gascoigne, Serafim Turtle Fun LOGO for the Spectrum 48K pp 42-46 | Spirolaterals  1985
 Wells, D. The Penguin Dictionary of Curious and Interesting Geometry London: Penguin, pp. 239-241, 1991.
 Krawczyk, Robert, "Hilbert's Building Blocks", Mathematics & Design, The University of the Basque Country, pp. 281-288, 1998.
 Krawczyk, Robert, Spirolaterals, Complexity from Simplicity, International Society of Arts, Mathematics and Architecture 99,The University of the Basque Country, pp. 293-299, 1999. 
 Krawczyk, Robert J. The Art of Spirolateral reversals

External links 
 Spirolaterals Javascript App

Types of polygons